Moderne architecture, also sometimes referred to as Style Moderne or simply Moderne, Jazz Age, Moderne, jazz modern or jazz style, describes certain styles of architecture popular from 1925 through the 1940s. It is closely related to Art Deco.

Originating in the International Exhibition of Modern Decorative and Industrial Arts held in Paris in 1925, the style has expression in styles traditionally classified as Art Deco, Streamline Moderne, Late Moderne, and, in the U.S., PWA/WPA Moderne. Architectural historian Richard Guy Wilson characterized the style by the eclectic co-existence of "traditionalism and modernism".

United States
The Moderne style of architecture appears as a descriptor in documentation of many buildings listed by the United States of America's National Register of Historic Places.

Streamline Moderne

Some Moderne architecture may be classified as Streamline Moderne, an evolution of Art Deco architecture which peaked in popularity . This can refer to land-based architecture, such as the Normandie Hotel in San Juan, Puerto Rico, which show curved, shiplike forms and styling. This follows the water-based adaptation of Art Deco decorative style and architecture to passenger ships, such as the SS Normandie. Other Streamline Moderne architecture does not reflect any maritime-oriented themes.

References

 
National Register of Historic Places architecture categories
Art Deco architecture in the United States
 M
American architectural styles